The House of YHWH (or "House of Yahweh", Hebrew בית יהוה) is a phrase found in the Hebrew Bible and on at least one inscription, usually referring to a temple.

Most modern religious scholars focus primarily upon Solomon's Temple, the First Temple in Jerusalem. However, there have been two other structures identified as a 'House of Yahweh': One is located in Elephantine Egypt; The other structure suggested as a House of Yahweh is a temple at Tel Arad.

"Jesus of Nazareth" quotes  – "...

In 1962 Yohanan Aharoni excavated a Judean temple at Tel Arad. The incense altars and two "standing stones" may have been dedicated to Yahweh and Asherah. An inscribed pottery shard found at the site, known as Ostracon 18, mentions a "House of YHWH", which scholars suggest may reference the temple at Arad or the Temple in Jerusalem.

See also
 Elephantine papyri

References 

Biblical phrases